Eggplant jam is a whole-fruit jam from the Azerbaijani and Turkish cuisines. In Turkey, it is especially popular in Antalya, Iğdır and Kağızman. The Governorate of Iğdır Province is making efforts to obtain a geographical indication for the name "patlıcan reçeli".

See also
 List of spreads

References 

Jams and jellies
Azerbaijani cuisine
Turkish cuisine
Eggplant dishes